Croydon Corporation Tramways  operated a tramway service in Croydon between 1900 and 1933.

History

Croydon Corporation Tramways took over the Croydon Tramways Company operation on 22 January 1900 and undertook a programme of modernisation and electrification. The tramway operation was leased to British Electric Traction.

The first electric services ran on 26 September 1901.

In 1906 the corporation took control of the tramway back from British Electric Traction.

The depot was located at  accessed from the junction of Brighton Road and Purley Downs Road.

Closure

The services were taken over by London Passenger Transport Board on 1 July 1933. Tramway operation in Croydon continued until final closure on 7 April 1951.

References

External links
 Croydon Corporation Tramways at British Tramway Company Badges and Buttons

Tram transport in England